Nicolae Ionuț Păun (born 19 January 1999) is a Romanian professional footballer who plays as a midfielder for Liga I side Sepsi OSK.

Club career
Păun made his Liga I debut for Sepsi OSK in a goalless draw with Universitatea Craiova, on 17 April 2021.

International career
Păun was called up to the Romania national team for the first time by coach Edward Iordănescu on 24 May 2022, for the four opening group games with Montenegro, Bosnia and Herzegovina, and Finland in the UEFA Nations League.

Career statistics

International

Honours
Sepsi OSK
Cupa României: 2021–22; runner-up: 2020–21
Supercupa României: 2022

References

External links
Nicolae Păun at Liga Profesionistă de Fotbal 

1999 births
Living people
People from Caracal, Romania
Romanian footballers
Association football forwards
Liga I players
Liga III players
Sepsi OSK Sfântu Gheorghe players
Romania international footballers